St. Lorenz (St. Lawrence) is a  medieval church of the former free imperial city of Nuremberg in southern Germany. It is dedicated to Saint Lawrence. The church  was badly damaged during the Second World War and later restored. It is one of the most prominent churches of the Evangelical Lutheran Church in Bavaria.

Architecture

The nave of the church was completed by around 1400. In 1439, work began on the choir in the form of a hall church in the late German Sondergotik style of Gothic architecture. The choir was largely completed by 1477 by Konrad Roriczer, although Jakob Grimm completed the intricate vaults.

In the choir one can find the carving of the Angelic Salutation by Veit Stoss, and the monumental tabernacle by Adam Kraft. The latter  includes a prominent figure of the sculptor himself.

The building and furnishing of the church was cared of by the city council and by wealthy citizens. This is probably the reason why the art treasures of St. Lawrence were spared during the iconoclasm during the Reformation period. Despite St. Lawrence being one of the first churches in Germany to be Lutheran (1525), the wealthy citizens of Nuremberg wanted to preserve the memory of their ancestors and refused the removal of the donated works of art.

The west facade is richly articulated, reflecting the wealth of the Nuremberg citizens. The facade is dominated by the two towers, mirroring St. Sebald and indirectly Bamberg Cathedral with a sharp towering West portal doorway, and an indented rose window 9 metres in diameter.

Organs

The church has three organs. 
Main organ. Steinmeyer, Oettingen, 1937 rebuilt by Klais Orgelbau, Bonn, 2003. 5 manuals
Stephans Organ. Steinmeyer op. 34 from 1862 formerly in the Evangelical Lutherin Church, Hersbruck, Restored in 2002 by Klais Orgelbau, Bonn. 2 manual
Laurentius Organ. Klais Orgelbau, Bonn 2005. 3 manual.

Organists of St. Lorenz

The church has employed organists for over 500 years, many of them prominent musicians within Bavaria. Amongst the famous names are the following:
Nicholas Pair (Bayer) ca. 1448
Hans Seber 1510 - 1517
Hans Feller 1517 - 1525
Interregnum from 1525
Georg Nötteleins ???? - 1565
Paulus Lautensack 1565 - 1571
Wilhelm Ende 1571 - 1581
Kasper Hassler 1587 - 1616
Johann Staaten 1611 - 1618 
Valentin Dretzel 1618 - 1634
Sigmund Theophil Staden 1634 - 1655
Albrect Martin Lunßdörffer 1688 - 1694
Johann Löhner 1694 - 1705
Wolfgang Förtsch 1705 - 1743
Cornelius Heinrich Dretzel 1743 - 1764
Johann Siebenkees 1764 - 1772
Johann Gottlieb Frör 1814 - 1823
Georg Friedrich Herrscher 1843 - 1870
Carl Christian Mattäus 1871 - 1914
Carl Böhm 1913 - 1917
Walther Körner 1918 - 1962

Gallery

 [[Angelic Salutation (Stoss)
]]

References

Sources

Lorenz
Nuremberg Lorenz
Nuremberg St Lorenz